The Dnieper chub or the Black Sea chub (Petroleuciscus borysthenicus) is a species of cyprinid fish from Eastern Europe. It is found in Bulgaria, Georgia, Greece, Moldova, Romania, Russia, Turkey, and Ukraine. It lives up to eight years.

References

Sources

Petroleuciscus
Fish described in 1859
Taxonomy articles created by Polbot